The State Street Baptist Church, formerly the First Colored Baptist Church, is a historic Baptist church at 340 State Street in Bowling Green, Kentucky.  It was built in 1898 and added to the National Register of Historic Places in 1979.

The church was the first formally organized church for blacks in Bowling Green.  It was formed in 1838 from slaves from the First Baptist Church.  The present church building, built in 1898, is a -story brick Gothic Revival-style church with buttresses.

References

Baptist churches in Kentucky
Churches on the National Register of Historic Places in Kentucky
Gothic Revival church buildings in Kentucky
Churches completed in 1898
19th-century Baptist churches in the United States
Churches in Warren County, Kentucky
African-American history of Kentucky
1898 establishments in Kentucky
National Register of Historic Places in Bowling Green, Kentucky